The 2005 NRL season was the 98th season of professional rugby league football in Australia and the eighth run by the National Rugby League. The lineup of clubs remained unchanged from the previous year, with fifteen teams contesting the 2005 Telstra Premiership, which culminated in a grand final between the Wests Tigers and the North Queensland Cowboys.

Season summary
In 2005 the NRL's salary cap was $3.25 million for the 25 highest-paid players in a club.

The season was statistically the closest season ever, with just sixteen points separating the Parramatta Eels (1st) and Newcastle Knights (15th). It was also notable in that the previous four premiers failed to qualify for the finals (Bulldogs, Penrith Panthers, Sydney Roosters and Newcastle Knights).

In the middle of 2005 the NRL reached a broadcasting rights agreement with Foxsports and Channel 9 worth $500 million over six years, representing a 65% increase in direct television income.

The Knights recorded their worst ever start to a season (13 straight losses) and were consigned to last place for the entire season. They did however win 8 of their last 11 games thanks to the return of superstar Andrew Johns. The Knights also defeated five of the top eight teams during the season, four of which were at home. They also recorded their then equal worst ever defeat - a 50-0 thrashing by the Parramatta Eels in round 14. During this match, an EnergyAustralia Stadium attendant ran onto the field, trying to tackle Parramatta's Daniel Wagon before he scored in the 78th minute. Minor premiers the Parramatta Eels lost to each of the bottom four teams (Bulldogs, Rabbitohs, Raiders and Knights in rounds 8, 2, 19 and 20 respectively) during the course of the season.

It was announced that the Gold Coast Titans were to be admitted into the NRL as the sixteenth team, scheduled to begin playing in the 2007 season. The Titans would recruit John Cartwright as their inaugural coach and Preston Campbell was their first signing.

Johnathan Thurston won the 2005 Dally M Medal by a single point from Newcastle's Andrew Johns, despite Johns missing over a third of the season with a broken jaw.

The two clubs that had players sent off won their matches (unlike in 2004) but the dismissal of John Hopoate made rugby league headlines. Hopoate was sent off in his team's win over the Cronulla Sharks and consequently received a 17-match ban. The Sea Eagles then terminated his contract.

The Wests Tigers became the first ever joint venture club to win the premiership, having formed in 2000 as a union between the Balmain Tigers and Western Suburbs Magpies, both foundation members of the original New South Wales Rugby Football League.

Teams

Advertising
In 2005 the NRL and their advertising agency MJW Hakuhodo for the third year running stayed with the Hoodoo Gurus' "That's My Team" soundtrack and developed three different musical executions.

The campaign focussed on the association of "strength" with the game and the ads featured three different musical interpretations of the song all without vocals. Each was created intending to bring out the positionings of rugby league characteristice of ‘strength of body’, ‘strength of mind’ and ‘strength of character’

Outdoor supersites also featured in suburban locations in NSW and local cinema versions of the TVC ran with a call to action inviting fans to attend a game of the team local to the cinema location.

Regular season

Bold – Home game
X – Bye
* – Golden point game
Opponent for round listed above margin

Ladder

Finals series
To decide the grand finalists from the top eight finishing teams, the NRL adopts the McIntyre final eight system.

Finals Chart

Grand Final

Statistics and records
The Broncos' Darren Smith was the NRL's oldest player in 2005 at 36 years and 284 days.
The Brisbane Broncos set a new club record for highest score conceded (50 points) and greatest losing margin (46 points), when they lost 50-4 against the Melbourne Storm at Olympic Park in Round 4. These records were broken in 2020 when they lost 59-0 to the Sydney Roosters in round 4, which was the first (of two) time Brisbane have failed to score a point at their home of Suncorp Stadium. 
 The Newcastle Knights lost a club record 13 straight matches from 13 March - 19 June, and went on to win the wooden spoon for the first time.
 In Rounds 23 and 24, the Canterbury Bulldogs suffered their worst defeats since 1935, when they lost 56-4 against the Parramatta Eels in Round 23, then lost 54-2 against Wests Tigers in Round 24.
 Wests Tigers' club record for their longest winning streak with 8 wins from round 16 to round 24.
 Wests Tigers' standing record for their biggest ever win : 54-2 over the Canterbury Bulldogs in Round 24.

Player statistics
The following statistics are as of the conclusion of Round 26.

Top 5 point scorers

Top 5 try scorers

Top 5 goal scorers

2005 Transfers

Players

Coaches

Sources and footnotes

External links
NRL official website
LeagueUnlimited
Rugby League Tables and Statistics 2005
Sports Australia League